Events of 2023 in Tanzania.

Incumbents 

 President
 Samia Suluhu
 Vice-President: 
 Philip Mpango
 Prime Minister: Kassim Majaliwa
 Chief Justice: Ibrahim Hamis Juma

Events 
Ongoing – COVID-19 pandemic in Tanzania; 2022 Africa floods

 21 January – Tanzanian opposition party Chadema organizes a political demonstration in Mwanza. This is the country's first demonstration since President Samia Suluhu Hassan abolished her predecessor John Magufuli's seven-year ban on political assembly earlier this month.
 12 March – Eight miners are killed in Geita Region, when their pit is flooded with rainwater.

See also 

2022–23 South-West Indian Ocean cyclone season
COVID-19 pandemic in Africa
Common Market for Eastern and Southern Africa
East African Community
International Conference on the Great Lakes Region

References

External links 

 

 
Tanzania
Tanzania
2020s in Tanzania
Years of the 21st century in Tanzania